Dexopollenia flava is a species of cluster fly in the family Polleniidae.

Distribution
India, Taiwan, Japan, China.

References

Polleniidae
Insects described in 1930
Diptera of Asia